Area codes 850 and 448 are telephone area codes in the North American Numbering Plan for the Florida Panhandle, including Pensacola, Tallahassee and Panama City. Area code 850 was created in 1997 in a split from 904, and area code 448 was assigned as a second code to the same area in an overlay plan in 2019, and mandatory ten-digit local calling began in May 2021.

History
When the North American Numbering Plan (NANP) was created by AT&T in 1947, the entire state of Florida was assigned the area code 305. In 1953, the western part of the peninsula from the Tampa Bay area southward received area code 813, and in 1965, North Florida from the Panhandle to Jacksonville was assigned area code 904 to mitigate the state's growth in population and telephone service. For thirty years, North Florida remained a single numbering plan area (NPA) until 1995, when the southern part of the territory was split off with area code 352. Continued demand put new pressure on the numbering resources, and within a year, further relief action was in the planning stage. The result was that the far western part of the panhandle (south of the Alabama state line) became a new numbering plan area with area code 850. Permissive dialing in the numbering plan area began June 23, 1997, and mandatory dialing commenced on March 23, 1998.

Original plan
Area code 850 was originally intended to be the relief code used in the 1995 split of the 904 area code.  The Jacksonville, Tallahassee, Panama City and Pensacola LATAs, and the Florida portion of the Mobile, Alabama LATA were to retain 904 while the Daytona Beach and Gainesville LATAs changed to 850.  This plan was scrapped in favor of a plan that moved only the Gainesville LATA to a new area code, this time 352 (FLA on the telephone keypad) and kept the Daytona Beach LATA in then-904 along with the rest of northern Florida.  The reason for changing from 850 to 352 was a potential dialing conflict with the 407-850 office code and some rate centers in the Gainesville LATA with 7-digit local calling into the 407 area code.  Political pressure from the tourism industry in Daytona Beach resulted in that area being kept in the then-904 area code.

The Florida Public Service Commission had planned a three-way split of 904 to take place in 1997.  The Jacksonville LATA would move to a proposed 234 area code while the Daytona Beach LATA would change to the 386 area code.  The Panhandle would have retained the 904 area code.  Outcry from the public and business community in the Jacksonville region was significant since Jacksonville is the largest urban area in northern Florida, and would thus face a greater expense and burden to change phone numbers, reprogram cell phones and update printed materials than other parts of the area code.  When an area code is split, normal practice calls for the old area code to be retained by the largest city in the former area code territory in order to minimize disruption. There was also opposition from NANPA and the Federal Communications Commission.  These two agencies objected because the split would have been unbalanced by creating a new code just for Daytona Beach.  The Florida PSC changed course and adopted the plan that was ultimately implemented with the Panhandle, including Tallahassee, moving to 850 and Jacksonville and Daytona Beach retaining 904.  The 234 area code has since been put into service in Ohio as an overlay to area code 330.

Relief planning for an overlay
Area code 850 exhausted its available supply of central office codes in May 2021. Based on previous exhaust forecasts, NANPA began relief planning to provide additional numbering capacity in the 850 region. An initial planning meeting was held on May 16, 2019, where industry members recommended an all-services overlay as the preferred relief method. NANPA subsequently filed a request with the Florida Public Service Commission to approve a new area code overlaying 850. The Florida Public Service Commission approved the industry's all-services overlay recommendation on November 5, 2019. The new area code, 448, was officially assigned to overlay 850. Ten-digit dialing became mandatory on May 22, 2021. The in-service date, when first central office code assignment can become effective, is June 22, 2021.  The first central office code assignment within the 448 area code occurred on May 14, 2021.

Service area
The 850/448 overlay numbering plan area comprises the following cities.
 Apalachicola
 Bonifay
 Blountstown
 Bristol
 Campbellton
 Cantonment
 Century
 Chipley
 Cottondale
 Crawfordville
 Crestview
 DeFuniak Springs
 Destin
 Fort Walton Beach
 Graceville
 Greenville
 Gulf Breeze
 Jay
 Lynn Haven
 Marianna
 Madison
 Milton
 Miramar Beach
 Monticello
 Mossy Head
 Navarre
 Niceville
 Pace
 Panama City
 Pensacola
 Perry
 Port Saint Joe
 Quincy
 Sopchoppy
 Tallahassee (State Capital)
 Valparaiso
 Wewahitchka

See also
List of Florida area codes
List of NANP area codes

References

External links

 List of exchanges from CIDLookup.com, 850 Area Code

850
850
Pensacola metropolitan area
Telecommunications-related introductions in 1997
1997 establishments in Florida